Hello World is a Telugu language comedy television series streaming on ZEE5. The show is directed by Siva Sai Vardhan and features Aryan Rajesh, Sadaa, Ram Nitin, Nayan Karishma, Sudharsan Govind & Nitya Shetty in Key roles. It has been produced by Niharika Konidela. PK Dandi created the music for the show.

Overview 
Hello World is an eight-episode slice of life workplace drama about 8 youngsters who join a large IT company, hoping that their struggles are all behind them, only to find that life has a lot more in store than they had imagined.

Plot 
The show opens with a bunch of college graduates - Siddharth, Varun, Amrutha, Meghana, Suresh, Rahul & Varsha - receiving job offers from a big IT company - PeopleTech. All of them arrive at the campus with dreamy eyes assuming that their future is going to be smooth and sorted. However, their excitement is short-lived when Prarthana, a senior IT employee working at the company, informs them that their jobs will be made permanent only after they all clear some mandatory training and evaluations. During the training period, they develop a beautiful bond among themselves and become friends. The situations these characters face prompt them to face many conflicts both personally and professionally and learn real-life lessons. The season ends on an emotional note by establishing the near-death situation of Raghav, their most admired trainer, and how they complete his unfinished project as a tribute to him.

Cast 

 Aryan Rajesh
 Sadha
 Ram Nitin
 Nayan Karishma
 Sudarshan Govind
 Nitya Shetty
 Ravi Varma (actor)
 Snehal Kamat

Reception

Critical response 
Hello World received mostly mixed reviews. The Times Of India rated it 3 out of 5. ABP News rated it 2.75 out of 5 and commented, “'Hello World' is a simple and honest web series”. OTTplay praised the performances of the cast and said, “Sivasai Vardhan, the director, lends authenticity to the portrayal of the corporate setup with his attention to detail”. Binged had a critical view of the show and called it a “bland drama”, while rating it 5.5 out of 10.

Popular response 
Hello World went on to become one of the most watched web series made in Telugu language, clocking over a 100 million minutes of watch time within two weeks of launch.

References

External links
 
 Hello World on ZEE5
2022 Indian television series debuts
ZEE5 original programming
Telugu-language web series
Telugu-language television shows